A marble cake (or Marmor) is a cake with a streaked or mottled appearance (like marble) achieved by very lightly blending light and dark batter. Due to its zebra-striped pattern, it is also called Zebra Cake. It can be a mixture of vanilla and chocolate cake, in which case it is mainly vanilla, with streaks of chocolate. Other possibilities are strawberry or other fruit flavors, or (particularly in marbled coffee cakes) cinnamon or other spices.

History 
Marmor is the German or Yiddish word for marble. The idea of marble cake seems to have originated in early nineteenth century Germany. The earliest version of marble cake consisted of a kugelhopf (sweet yeast bread), one half of which was colored with molasses and spices to achieve a dark colored batter. Bakers next began to do the same thing with sponge cake batter. The usage of chocolate in the Rhein-Ruhr area in the twentieth century has now made this a common version of marble cake across Germany and Austria.

The cake was brought to America shortly before the Civil War, and the term marble cake was first recorded in English in September 29, 1859 issue of Illinois State Chronicle (Decatur). One popular variation of this recipe during Victorian times was “Harlequin cake,” which was baked with checkerboard patterns.

Use as an academic metaphor 
In the field of geology, the "Marble Cake Mantle" model refers to the theory of an earth wherein "elongated strips of subducted oceanic lithosphere... are stretched and thinned by the normal and shear strains in the convecting mantle, and are destroyed by being reprocessed at ocean ridges or, on the centimetre scale, by dissolution processes."

In politics, marble cake federalism, also known as cooperative federalism, is defined in contrast to dual federalism, also known as layer cake federalism. The metaphor of marble cake is meant to conceptualize how local, state, and federal governments have interacting, interrelated policy goals. The term was coined by American political scientist Morton Grodzins.

World records 
In 2019, British-American television host John Oliver unveiled a  marble cake on an episode of his comedy series Last Week Tonight with John Oliver, featuring an image of Turkmenistan's autocratic president Gurbanguly Berdimuhamedow falling off a horse during a race, intended to satirize Berdimuhamedow's penchant for amassing world records. The cake was submitted to Guinness World Records, but was denied – one of the conditions for certification was a non-disparagement agreement against Guinness, including its relationships with authoritarian regimes, which Oliver described as "clearly ridiculous".

References

External links

German cakes